Tomasello can refer to:
 Michael Tomasello (born 1950), an American developmental psychologist and linguist.
 Tomasello Winery, a winery located in New Jersey, United States.